The Greece national under-20 football team is the national under-20 football team of Greece and is controlled by the Hellenic Football Federation, the governing body for football in Greece. The team competes in the FIFA U-20 World Cup, which is held every two years. To qualify for this tournament (which is held in odd years), the team must finish in the top six of the UEFA European Under-19 Football Championship from the previous year.

Competitive record

FIFA World Youth Championship/U-20 World Cup Record

Current squad

Former squads
2013 FIFA under-20 World Cup squads - Greece

See also
Greece national football team
Greece national under-23 football team
Greece national under-21 football team
Greece national under-19 football team
Greece national under-17 football team

References

External links
Hellenic Football Federation 
Greece under-20 on UEFA.com

European national under-20 association football teams
under
Youth football in Greece